The Ministry of Justice (MoJ) is a government agency in Saudi Arabia was established in 1970 by King Faisal of Saudi Arabia to oversee the administration of the country's court system. The main role of the Ministry is to monitor the Saudi courts and fulfill their financial and administrative requirements. By 2020 and in line with the Saudi Transformation Program, the Ministry of Justice is planning to digitalize 80% of its services.

List of ministers
 Mohammed bin Ali al Harkan (1971-1976) 
 Ibrahim ibn Muhammad Al ash-Sheikh (1975-1990)
 Mohammed bin Ibrahim bin Jubair (1990-1992)
 Abdullah ibn Muhammad Al ash-Sheikh (1992-2009)
 Muhammad bin Abdul Karim Issa (2009-2015)
 Walid bin Mohammed Al Samani (2015–present)

See also
 Politics of Saudi Arabia

References

Saudi
Justice